201 Squadron "Falcões" (Esquadra 201) is a fighter squadron of the Portuguese Air Force, operating the F-16 Fighting Falcon.

Roles and missions
201 Sqn has as its primary mission the execution of air defense operations and conventional attack:
 Air defense operations;
 Offensive air operations, with the exception of suppression of enemy air defenses (SEAD);
 Anti-surface operations (ASFAO), to include aerial interdiction (AI), close air support (CAS), anti-surface warfare (ASuW) with the exception of anti-submarine warfare (ASW).

History

The origins of 201 Squadron "Falcões" date back to the creation of 50 Squadron "Falcões" (Falcons) in 1958, based at Ota (then designated Air Base No. 2), operating the F-86F Sabre. On September 11, 1958, the squadron's designation was changed to 51 Squadron and it was later transferred to Air Base No. 5, in Monte Real, on October 4, 1959. The squadron became part of 501st Operational Group.

The first F-86F flight by a Portuguese pilot took place on September 22, 1958, by 50 Squadron. Two days later, on September 24, a F-86F breaks for the first time the sound barrier in Portugal.

In the beginning of the 1960s, the flight demonstration team "Dragões" (Dragons) was reactivated with the F-86F as part of 51 Squadron.

On August 15, 1961, a detachment of eight F-86F fighters was deployed to Guinea-Bissau until October 1964, in what was called Operation Atlas, during which they flew 577 sorties, of which 430 were ground-attack missions.

From 1961 to 1970 51 Squadron also operated five T-33 AN Silver Star aircraft; having also operated the Fiat G-91 R4 from November 1965 to 1974. These were used in the transition and conversion of fighter pilots from the F-86F to the G.91 that were in the Portuguese African colonies.

Starting in 1977, 51 Squadron additionally operated six T-38A Talon in advanced combat training, with a second batch of six T-38A aircraft being delivered and operated by 1980. Later that year all T-38 trainers were transferred to 103 Squadron, also based at Monte Real.

With further reorganizations of the Air Force, the operational group of which the squadron was part of was re-designated as Operational Group 51, and in 1978 the squadron's own designation was changed to 201 Squadron.

The F-86F Sabre ended its service in the Portuguese Air Force officially on July 31, 1980, and 201 Squadron was later disbanded on June 1, 1981.

In 1981, 302 Squadron, to which the missions of tactical air support for maritime operations (TASMO) and air interdiction were assigned, was activated and the squadron continued to serve with the traditions of the "Falcões".

201 Squadron was reactivated on October 4, 1993, with aerial defense as its mission, the first F-16 Fighting Falcon arriving in June 1994. In 1997 the squadron initiated its qualification in air-to-ground missions and in July 1998 it was attributed the primary mission of air defense operations and close air support and air interdiction as secondary missions. In 1999, the tactical air support for maritime operations (TASMO) was also assigned as one of its secondary missions.

On May 26, 2011, the squadron officially started operating the upgraded F-16 MLU fighter.

Lineage
 Constituted as Esquadra 50 (50 Squadron) on February 4, 1958
Re-designated as Esquadra 51 (51 Squadron) on September 11, 1958
Re-designated as Esquadra 201 (201 Squadron) in 1978
Disbanded on June 1, 1981
 Reactivated as Esquadra 201 (201 Squadron) on October 4, 1993

Aircraft
 F-86 Sabre F (1958–1980)
 Five T-33 Silver Star AN (1961–1970)
 Fiat G-91 R4 (1965–1974)
 T-38 Talon A (1977–1980)
 F-16 Fighting Falcon A (1994–2010)
 F-16 Fighting Falcon M (2010–Present)

Notable pilots
 Captain António Roque: first Portuguese pilot to reach 1000 flight hours in F-16s (1999)

Deployments

 Operation Allied Force (the NATO bombing of Yugoslavia) (March 23, 1999 – June 10, 1999)201 Squadron was deployed to Italy with a detachment of three F-16s. Since these aircraft were not converted to MLU standards, they were restricted to combat air patrol (CAP) missions during the conflict.
 Exercise Red Flag (2000)The Portuguese detachment consisted of six F-16s.
 Operation Baltic Air Policing (November 1, 2007 – December 15, 2007)201 Squadron participated in patrolling the skies of the Baltic states (Lithuania, Estonia and Latvia) with four F-16 A Block 15 along with two F-16 AM of 301 Squadron.

See also
 Portuguese Air Force
 List of F-16 Fighting Falcon operators
 Portuguese Colonial War
 301 Squadron
 302 Squadron
 Davis-Monthan Air Force Base

References

External links
 201 Squadron information at the Portuguese Air Force official website 
 201 Squadron, official website 
 Website produced by the 201 Pilots 
 Unofficial website dedicated to 201 Squadron 
 PoAF participation in the Baltic Air Policing '07, Portuguese Air Force official website dedicated to the operation
 PoAF 201st esquadra, squadron information at F-16.net

Portuguese Air Force aircraft squadrons
Military units and formations established in 1958
1958 establishments in Portugal
Military of Portugal